Korea at the 2018 Winter Olympics refers to Korea and the Olympics. It may refer to one of the Korean teams at the 2018 Winter Olympics. 
 Korea at the 2018 Winter Olympics (IOC code: COR), the unified team composed of Olympians from North Korea and South Korea, playing together under one flag and anthem
 South Korea at the 2018 Winter Olympics (IOC code: KOR), the Republic of Korea team composed of South Koreans playing under the South Korean flag and anthem
 North Korea at the 2018 Winter Olympics (IOC code: PRK), the Democratic People's Republic of Korea team composed of North Koreans playing under the North Korean flag and anthem
 2018 Winter Olympics, held in PyeongChang, South Korea; with related venues, effects and environment at the Winter Olympics
 Venues of the 2018 Winter Olympics and Paralympics
 Pyeongchang bid for the 2018 Winter Olympics

See also
 Korea at the Olympics (disambiguation)